1994 Giants season may refer to:

1994 San Francisco Giants season
1994 New York Giants season